Hortense J. Spillers (born 1942) is an American literary critic, Black Feminist scholar and the Gertrude Conaway Vanderbilt Professor at Vanderbilt University. A scholar of the African diaspora, Spillers is known for her essays on African-American literature, collected in Black, White, and In Color: Essays on American Literature and Culture, published by the University of Chicago Press in 2003, and Comparative American Identities: Race, Sex, and Nationality in the Modern Text, a collection edited by Spillers published by Routledge in 1991.

Life
Spillers received her B.A. from University of Memphis in 1964, M.A. in 1966, and her Ph.D in English at Brandeis University in 1974. While at the University of Memphis, she was a disc jockey for the all-black radio station WDIA. She has held positions at Haverford College, Wellesley College, Emory University, and Cornell University. Her work has been recognized with awards from the Rockefeller and Ford Foundations. In 2013, she was the founding editor of the scholarly journal The A-Line Journal, A Journal of Progressive Commentary.

Critical work
Spillers is best known for her 1987 scholarly essay "Mama's Baby, Papa's Maybe: An American Grammar Book", one of the most cited essays in African-American literary studies. The essay is considered to be especially important to the field of Afro-pessimism, as many of the field's most prominent theorists—Frank Wilderson III, Saidiya Hartman, and Calvin L. Warren—draw on Spillers' ideas throughout their works. Despite this, Spillers does not identify as an Afro-pessimist. The essay brings together Spillers' investments in African-American studies, feminist theory, semiotics, and cultural studies to articulate a theory of African-American female gender construction.

In 2003, she published the book Black, White, and in Color, which was largely inspired by the 1982 Barnard Center Conference, called "Sex Conference"  Spillers attended this conference and was struck by the lack of representation of black women's sexuality, and how the dominance of whiteness in feminist spaces was leading to hierarchies within feminism and sexuality. Thus a prominent chapter in Spillers's book, entitled "Interstices: A Small Drama of Words," re-examines the harmful characterization of black women in literature and in society at large. She approaches these topics through a grammarly lens, and reappropriates the term "Interstices" from a computer science phrase to a description of the flaws in our modern language that allow some things to metaphorically 'slip through the cracks'. She notes problems with words such 'feminism' and 'woman' and emphasizes the power that comes with the ability to speak. Spillers argues that black women's sexuality is poorly described in speech because of institutions of white supremacy, which in turn objectifies and silences them. 

Further, Spillers claims that black women are uniquely positioned between black men and white women, often forced to choose their respective identities and cannot act satisfactorily on neither their gender nor their sex. Spillers problematizes the compounded adversity black women face with the following quote: "Black women are the beached whales of the sexual universe, unvoiced, unseen, not doing, awaiting their verb. Their sexual experiences are depicted, but not often by them, and if and by the subject herself, often in the guise of vocal music, often in the self-contained accent and sheer romance of the blues.’’ Despite historically being equal in the eyes of the hegemonic and patriarchal white environment, Spillers argues that black men and women are indeed different because black men are still given the agency to act upon their sex whereas women are subjected to "the paradox of nonbeing." This paradox describes how black women's sexualities are never validated to begin with, ergo they cannot sympathize with white women on the basis of sex. Spiller's paradox is a response to Judy Chicago's Dinner Party and it's portrayal of the black woman's vagina, but the sentiment holds for gender construction and sexuality as a whole.

In a 2006 interview entitled, "Whatcha Gonna Do?—Revisiting Mama's Baby, Papa's Maybe: An American Grammar Book" Spillers was interviewed by Saidiya Hartman, Farah Jasmine Griffin, Jennifer L. Morgan, and Shelly Eversley. In that interview Spillers shares insight into her writing process, and her interviewers collectively elucidate the seismic impact of the essay on the conceptual vocabulary available to subsequent generations of Black Feminist scholars. She states that she wrote "Mama's Baby, Papa's Maybe" with a sense of hopelessness. She was in part writing in response to All the Women Are White, All the Blacks Are Men, But Some of Us Are Brave (1982). Spillers was writing to a moment in history where the importance of black women in critical theory was being denied. She wrote with a sense of urgency in order to create a theoretical taxonomy for black women to be studied in the academy.

The Moynihan Report as basis for Spillers' critical work 
The Moynihan Report states that the perceived cause of the deterioration of the black society was the black family's deterioration. The report proceeds to say that "the family is the basic social unit of American life: it is the basic socializing unit". Adult behavior is learned from what is taught as a child by the family institution. Mass media portrays the American family as one that is standardized to a nuclear family structure. This report asserts that families with stronger bonds "characteristically progress more rapidly than others". It goes on to argue that "there is one truly great discontinuity in family structure in the United States at the present time: that between the white world in general and that of the Negro American". The report states that "nearly a quarter of Urban Negro Marriages are Dissolved," and that the proportion of non-white women with husbands continued to decline between 1950 and 1960. This did not happen in white families to the same degree. It states that almost 25% of black births are illegitimate and that the number of illegitimate black births are increasing. Almost 25% of black families are led by females, in contrast with the typical patriarchal, nuclear structure. Moynihan links all of these 'deficiencies' in relation to typical conceptions of the American family with the breakdown of the black race, leading to an "increase in welfare dependency".

The Moynihan report concludes that black families are impoverished due to the manner in which they dissolve the typical white family structure. The role reversal within black families—that the mother is the primary and present authority in the household and the fathers are absent, according to the report—deserves culpability for black familial "deficiencies". Spillers' work is a critique of sexism and racism in psychoanalysis of black feminism. Through naming typical stereotypes ascribed to black women, Spillers begins to refute the negative perceptions ascribed to the black family and black familial matriarchal structure asserted throughout the Moynihan Report. The report's relation between black men and black women leads to an ungendering of both sexes, as black sexes become interchangeable rather than distinct. As slavery was a primary factor leading to the contemporary formation of the black family, it is important to highlight slavery's role in ungendering as well. Both male and female slaves served the same purpose—as property or animals rather than people. The only discrepancy between the two was that black women could be used as birthing objects. In slave times, rarely was the father present in the lives of slave children, yet, typically there was a mother-figure present. Whether slave children were robbed of their fathers when they were sold to other plantations or due to the fact that their father was their slave master, unable to be present in the slave child's life, it became customary for slave children to endure distance from the father figure. While this translates to contemporary black families at times, it does not define all families, nor does it limit the capacities of the mother in her potential role as matriarch. Matriarchy does not destroy the black American family.

Parallels to Other Black Feminist Scholars
Spillers has been referenced numerous times by influential Black feminist group The Combahee River Collective. In an interview between Beverly Guy-Sheftall and Barbara Smith, Smith cites a variety of scholars that "were able to find each other during that period" in salons. Among the list, Spillers is included here. Smith is also labeled as one of the "people who became real pillars of building Black women's studies in their particular fields". Smith claims that she, Spillers, and other notable black women of the time formed what was known as the Afric-American Female Intelligence Society of Boston.

Works
Books:
Spillers, Hortense J. "Black, White, and in Color: Essays on American Literature and Culture". Chicago: University of Chicago Press, 2003.
Spillers, Hortense J. "Comparative American Identities: Race, Sex, and Nationality in the Modern Text.". New York: Routledge, 1991.
Pryse, Marjorie, and Spillers, Hortense J. "Conjuring: Black Women, Fiction, and Literary Tradition". Bloomington: Indiana University Press, 1985.

Articles:
Spillers, Hortense J. “‘Born Again’: Faulkner and the Second Birth.” Fifty Years after Faulkner, edited by Jay Watson and Ann J. Abadie, University Press of Mississippi, JACKSON, 2016, pp. 57–78.
Spillers, Hortense J. "Art Talk and the Uses of History.". Small Axe, vol. 19 no. 3, 2015, p. 175-185.
Spillers, Hortense J. "Views of the East Wing: On Michelle Obama". Communication and Critical/Cultural Studies, 6:3, 307-310, 2009.
Spillers, Hortense J, et al. “‘Whatcha Gonna Do?": Revisiting ‘Mama's Baby, Papa's Maybe: An American Grammar Book’: A Conversation with Hortense Spillers, Saidiya Hartman, Farah Jasmine Griffin, Shelly Eversley, & Jennifer L. Morgan.” Women's Studies Quarterly, vol. 35, no. 1/2, 2007, pp. 299–309.
Spillers, Hortense J. “‘Twentieth-Century Literature's’ Andrew J. Kappel Prize in Literary Criticism, 2007.” Twentieth Century Literature, vol. 53, no. 2, 2007, pp. vi-x.,
Spillers, Hortense J. “The Idea of Black Culture.” CR: The New Centennial Review, vol. 6, no. 3, 2006, pp. 7–28.
Spillers, Hortense J. “A Tale of Three Zoras: Barbara Johnson and Black Women Writers.”. Diacritics, vol. 34, no. 1, 2004, pp. 94–97.
Spillers, Hortense J. “Topographical Topics: Faulknerian Space.” The Mississippi Quarterly, vol. 57, no. 4, 2004, pp. 535–568.
Spillers, Hortense J. "Travelling with Faulkner". Critical Quarterly, 45: 8-17, 2003.
Spillers, Hortense J. “‘All the Things You Could Be by Now, If Sigmund Freud's Wife Was Your Mother’: Psychoanalysis and Race.” Boundary 2, vol. 23, no. 3, 1996, pp. 75–141.
Spillers, Hortense J. “The Crisis of the Negro Intellectual: A Post-Date.” Boundary 2, vol. 21, no. 3, 1994, pp. 65–116.
Spillers, Hortense J. “Moving on Down the Line.”. American Quarterly, vol. 40, no. 1, 1988, pp. 83–109. JSTOR, www.jstor.org/stable/2713143.
Spillers, Hortense J. “Mama's Baby, Papa's Maybe: An American Grammar Book.” Diacritics, vol. 17, no. 2, 1987, pp. 65–81.
Spillers, Hortense J. “'AN ORDER OF CONSTANCY': NOTES ON BROOKS AND THE FEMININE.” The Centennial Review, vol. 29, no. 2, 1985, pp. 223–248.
Spillers, Hortense J. “A Hateful Passion, a Lost Love.” Feminist Studies, vol. 9, no. 2, 1983, pp. 293–323.
Spillers, Hortense J. “Formalism Comes to Harlem.” Black American Literature Forum, vol. 16, no. 2, 1982, pp. 58–63.
Spillers, Hortense J., et al. “The Works of Ralph Ellison.” PMLA, vol. 95, no. 1, 1980, pp. 107–109.
Spillers, Hortense J. “A DAY IN THE LIFE OF CIVIL RIGHTS.”. The Black Scholar, vol. 9, no. 8/9, 1978, pp. 20–27.
Spillers, Hortense J. “Ellison's ‘Usable Past’: Toward a Theory of Myth.” Interpretations, vol. 9, no. 1, 1977, pp. 53–69.
Spillers, Hortense J. “A Lament”. The Black Scholar, vol. 8, no. 5, 1977, pp. 12–16.
Spillers, Hortense J. “: SECOND PRIZE-The Black Scholar Essay Contest: MARTIN LUTHER KING AND THE STYLE OF THE BLACK SERMON.” The Black Scholar, vol. 3, no. 1, 1971, pp. 14–27.

Reviews:
Spillers, Hortense J. “Review: 'Kinship and Resemblances: Women on Women.'” Feminist Studies, vol. 11, no. 1, 1985, pp. 111–125.
Spillers, Hortense J. Review: "Lorraine Hansberry: Art of Thunder, Vision of Light." Special Issue of "Freedomways". Signs, vol. 6, no. 3, 1981, pp. 526–527.
Spillers, Hortense J. "Review: 'GET YOUR ASS IN THE WATER AND SWIM LIKE ME': NARRATIVE POETRY FROM BLACK ORAL TRADITION by Bruce Jackson". The Black Scholar, vol. 7, no. 5, 1976, pp. 44–46.
Spillers, Hortense J. "Review: Black Popular Culture. by Michele Wallace, Gina Dent; Black Macho and the Myth of the Superwoman. by Michele Wallace; Invisibility Blues--From Pop to Theory by Michele Wallace". African American Review, vol. 29, no. 1, 1995, pp. 123–126.

References

Spillers, Hortense “Interstices: A Small Drama of Words” in White, 
Black, and In Color, 2003: 152-175.

External links
Haslett, Tim. Hortense Spillers Interviewed by Tim Haslett for the Black Cultural Studies website collective. Ithaca, New York. February 4, 1998.
Black Cultural Studies-Hortense J. Spillers

1942 births
Living people
African-American academics
American women academics
American feminist writers
Brandeis University alumni
University of Memphis alumni
Vanderbilt University faculty